"Original Don" is a song by musical project Major Lazer and the Partysquad from their 2011 extended play of the same name. It was released as a digital download on 4 November 2011. The song charted in the Netherlands.

Background
An undished version of "Original Don" had surfaced on the Internet months before its official release. The song's initial cover artwork was inspired by the fictional character Don Draper.

Music video
A music video to accompany the release of "Original Don" was first released onto YouTube on 8 December 2011 at a total length of two minutes and forty-two seconds. It features an American family, dancing around carrying various blade weapons. Diplo makes a cameo in the video.

Track listing

Chart performance

Release history

In popular culture
A portion from the middle of the song was prominently featured in a television advertisement for The Cosmopolitan of Las Vegas, which aired in the summer of 2013 through the winter of 2013–14.

The version featuring the Partysquad appeared on Dancing with the Stars during James Maslow and Peta Murgatroyd's freestyle dance number.

Florida Gators gymnast, Bridget Sloan, used the song as her floor music for the 2015 season.

References

2011 singles
Major Lazer songs
2011 songs
Downtown Records singles
Songs written by Diplo
Trap music songs